Robert B. Warren was an American economist and banking expert.   He was a member of the faculty of the Institute for Advanced Study from 1939 until his death in 1950.

Education and career
Warren got an A.M. at Harvard University in 1916.  In 1919 he went to work for the Federal Reserve in Washington.

In 1935 Abraham Flexner was struggling to establish a School of Economics and Politics at the recently founded Institute for Advanced Study in Princeton, New Jersey.  The school initially consisted of Edward M. Earle, David Mitrany, and Winfield W. Riefler.  In 1939 Warren joined the school on the recommendation of then trustee Walter W. Stewart who had worked with him at the Federal Reserve. But Flexner had established the economics school without the approval of the other faculty and this led to his resignation as Director of the Institute in 1939.

Nevertheless, during World War II members of the IAS School of Economics and Politics did important war work. In 1944 Warren along with IAS colleague Walter W. Stewart advised the Treasury Department in Washington on the relation between fiscal operations and the banking system.

Warren was elected to the American Philosophical Society in 1949.

References

External links
 Home page of Robert B. Warren at the Institute for Advanced Study

American economists
Institute for Advanced Study faculty
Harvard University alumni
1950 deaths
Members of the American Philosophical Society